Senlac is a village in the Canadian province of Saskatchewan within the Rural Municipality of Senlac No. 411 and Census Division No. 13. The village was named after Senlac Hill, the location of the Battle of Hastings in England in 1066.

History 
Senlac incorporated as a village on October 11, 1916.

Demographics 

Notable people 
Senlac was the childhood home to professional ice hockey player Curtis Brown.

See also 
 List of communities in Saskatchewan
 Villages of Saskatchewan

References

Villages in Saskatchewan
Senlac No. 411, Saskatchewan
Division No. 13, Saskatchewan